
Year 787 (DCCLXXXVII) was a common year starting on Monday  of the Julian calendar. The denomination 787 for this year has been used since the early medieval period, when the Anno Domini calendar era became the prevalent method in Europe for naming years.

Events 
 By place 

 Byzantine Empire 
 Empress Irene sends a Byzantine expeditionary army to invade southern Italy, but it is defeated and driven out (at Pope Adrian I's urging) by the Frankish army, allied with the forces of Benevento. She breaks off the engagement (see 782) between her son Constantine VI and the Frankish princess Rotrude, daughter of King Charlemagne.

 Europe 
 August 26 – Arechis II, autonomous prince (or duke) of Benevento, dies. Grimoald III, taken hostage by the Franks, succeeds his father as ruler of Benevento.
 Maurizio Galbaio, doge of Venice, dies after a 22-year reign and is succeeded by his son Giovanni. He begins a vendetta against the patriarch of Grado (Italy).

 Britain 

 Kings Offa of Mercia and Beorhtric of Wessex call the Synod of Chelsea in Kent, which is attended by the Papal legates. There, Offa persuades the Papacy to grant Archepiscopal status to the Mercian See of Lichfield. In order to secure the royal succession, he has Hygeberht crown his son Ecgfrith king of Mercia at Brixworth.

 By topic 

 Religion 
 Second Council of Nicaea: Empress Irene restores the veneration of icons (images of Christ and saints). This is a major victory of the monks, who will advance extensive claims to complete freedom for the Eastern Orthodox Church in religious matters. This ends the iconoclastic period in the Byzantine Empire.

Births 
 Abu Ma'shar al-Balkhi, Muslim scholar and astrologer (approximate date)
 Li Deyu, chancellor of the Tang Dynasty (d. 850) 
 Muhammad ibn Harun al-Amin, Muslim caliph (d. 813)

Deaths 
 August 26 – Arechis II, duke of Benevento
 Hyecho, Korean Buddhist monk (b. 704)
 Maurizio Galbaio, doge of Venice
 Willibald, bishop of Eichstätt (approximate date)

References